Bruno Catarzi (January 5, 1903 in Signa – January 21, 1996 in Florence) was an Italian sculptor and engraver.

Biography
He began his studies at the Academy of Fine Arts of Florence under Domenico Trentacoste. He was a prolific designer of medals.
In the 1930s, he taught at the Scuola d’Arte of Pistoia (among his pupils were Agenore Fabbri and Jorio Vivarelli), from 1963 to 1973, he taught at the Istituto d’Arte of Arezzo.

References
Francesco Sapori, Medaglie e Medaglisti, Home Faber, Anno XIII, N. 123–124, Rome, 1962
Francesco Giannone, La medaglia italiana alla Zecca di Parigi, Home Faber, Anno XVI, N. 161, Rome, 1966
Giuliana Signorini, Firenze e il paiolo nella storia dell’arte, Giorgi & Cambi, Firenze, 1992
Gigi Salvagnini, Cimitero delle Porte Sante, Opus Libri, Firenze, 2001
Ilaria Taddei, A decorare architetture, Giunti Editore, Firenze,  2003
Marco Moretti, Bruno Catarzi Scultore 1903–1996, Masso delle Fate Edizioni, Signa, 2005, 
Giampiero Fossi, Oltre il novecento – Arte contemporanea nelle Signe, Masso delle Fate Edizioni, Signa, 2003,

References 

Italian engravers
People from Signa
1903 births
1996 deaths
20th-century Italian sculptors
20th-century Italian male artists
Italian male sculptors
Accademia di Belle Arti di Firenze alumni
20th-century engravers